Stare Rzewuski  is a large village in the administrative district of Gmina Przesmyki, within Siedlce County, Masovian Voivodeship, in east-central Poland.

References

Stare Rzewuski